Pilga Station is a pastoral lease and sheep station located  south west of Marble Bar and  north of Newman in the Pilbara region of Western Australia.

The property also had 23 wells, was equipped with mills, a homestead and shearing shed. The Shaw River flows through a portion of Pilga.

In 1928 sheep from Pilga produced 134 bales of wool.

Shearers shore 15,400 sheep at Pilga in 1934, including 3,000 summer lambs producing 151 bales of wool; the clip was  better than the previous record.

In 1954 the station owner, J. J. Doughty, took miners to the Wardens court to seek the forfeiture of 16 mining tenements for non-compliance of labour conditions and continual use of water rights at the Cooglegong tin-field situated on the property.

See also
List of ranches and stations
List of pastoral leases in Western Australia

References

Pastoral leases in Western Australia
Pilbara
Stations (Australian agriculture)